Marek Rigo (born 15 December 1997) is a Slovak footballer who currently plays for Austrian Regionalliga East club Wiener Viktoria as an attacking midfielder.

Club career

ŠK Slovan Bratislava
Marek Rigo made his professional Fortuna Liga's debut for ŠK Slovan Bratislava on September 10, 2016 against Spartak Myjava.

References

External links
 ŠK Slovan Bratislava official club profile
 
 Futbalnet profile

1997 births
Living people
Slovak footballers
Slovak expatriate footballers
Association football midfielders
ŠK Slovan Bratislava players
FK Senica players
FC ViOn Zlaté Moravce players
KFC Komárno players
Austrian Regionalliga players
Slovak Super Liga players
2. Liga (Slovakia) players
Footballers from Bratislava
Slovak expatriate sportspeople in Austria
Expatriate footballers in Austria